The King of Arms of the Order of the Bath, or Bath King of Arms, is the herald of the Order of the Bath. He is not a member of the Heralds College, but takes precedence next after the Garter King of Arms. He wears a crown.

Kings of Arms

References

Order of the Bath
Offices of arms